Scleromystax is a genus of fish in the family Callichthyidae endemic to small tributaries from several coastal river basins draining the southern and southeastern regions in Brazil. Most of the species of Scleromystax are highly sexually dimorphic; males have developed odontodes inserted in fleshy papillae on the preopercular-opercular region and the dorsal and pectoral fins are 2–3 times as long as those of females. S. salmacis is an exception, as its sexually dimorphic features are subtle and non-remarkable.

Taxonomy
The species of Scleromystax were previously classified within the genus Corydoras. However, Scleromystax species are now thought to be more closely related to Aspidoras in a tribe called Aspidoradini. Although the monophyly of Scleromystax has been demonstrated, phylogenetic relationships of its species remains obscure. In addition, the taxonomic status of its species are only partially resolved.

Species
There are currently 5 recognized species in this genus:
 Scleromystax barbatus (Quoy & Gaimard, 1824) 
 Scleromystax macropterus (Regan, 1913) 
 Scleromystax prionotos (Nijssen & Isbrücker, 1980)
 Scleromystax reisi M. R. Britto, Fukakusa & L. R. Malabarba, 2016 
 Scleromystax salmacis M. R. Britto & R. E. dos Reis, 2005

References

Callichthyidae
Fish of South America
Taxa named by Albert Günther
Catfish genera
Freshwater fish genera